Edwin Michael Conway (March 6, 1934 - August 9, 2004) was an American prelate of the Roman Catholic Church. He served as an auxiliary bishop of the Archdiocese of Chicago in Illinois from 1995 to 2004.

Early life and education
Edwin Conway was born in Chicago, Illinois, the second son of Edwin and Nellie Conway.  He attended Our Lady of the Angels School on the city's west side and  Quigley Preparatory Seminary in Chicago.  He studied at St. Mary of the Lake Seminary in Mundelein, Illinois, where he received Bachelor of Philosophy and Master of Divinity degrees. In 1970, Conway received a Master of Social Work degree from Loyola University Chicago.

Priesthood
Conway was ordained a priest for the Archdiocese of Chicago by Cardinal Albert Meyer on May 3, 1960.  His first two assignments were as an associate pastor at two Chicago parishes: St. Bonaventure (1960-1965) and at St. Mary of the Lake (1965-1967).  After graduating from Loyola, he went to work for Catholic Charities in the archdiocese full-time where he held a variety of positions, including its administrator.

Episcopacy
On January 24, 1995, Pope John Paul II named Conway as titular bishop of Augurus and auxiliary bishop of the Archdiocese of Chicago. He was consecrated by Cardinal Joseph Bernardin.  Auxiliary Bishops Alfred Abramowicz and Timothy Lyne were the principal co-consecrators.  Conway served as episcopal vicar of Vicariate II from 1995 to 2003. On August 19, 2003 he was appointed by Cardinal Francis George as the vicar general of the archdiocese.  Conway held that position until he died from esophageal cancer on August 9, 2004.

References

1934 births
2004 deaths
Clergy from Chicago
University of Saint Mary of the Lake alumni
Loyola University Chicago alumni
20th-century American Roman Catholic titular bishops
21st-century American Roman Catholic titular bishops
Catholics from Illinois